The Milwaukee Brewers' 1998 season was the first season for the franchise as a member of the National League.  The Brewers finished in fifth in the NL Central, 28 games behind the Houston Astros, with a record of 74 wins and 88 losses. Before the 1998 regular season began, two new teams—the Arizona Diamondbacks and Tampa Bay Devil Rays—were added by Major League Baseball. This resulted in the American League and National League having 15 teams. However, in order for MLB officials to continue primarily intraleague play, both leagues would need to carry a number of teams that was divisible by two, so the decision was made to move one club from the AL Central to the NL Central.

This realignment was widely considered to have great financial benefit to the club moving. However, to avoid the appearance of a conflict of interest, Commissioner (then club owner) Bud Selig decided another team should have the first chance to switch leagues. The choice was offered to the Kansas City Royals, who ultimately decided to stay in the American League. The choice then fell to the Brewers, who, on November 6, 1997, elected to move to the National League. Had the Brewers elected not to move to the National League, the Minnesota Twins would have been offered the opportunity to switch leagues.

Offseason
 December 1, 1997: Jack Voigt was released by the Brewers.
 December 8, 1997: Mike Fetters, Ben McDonald, and Ron Villone were traded by the Brewers to the Cleveland Indians for Marquis Grissom and Jeff Juden.
 January 14, 1998: Bob Hamelin was signed as a free agent by the Brewers.
 March 11, 1998: Mark Watson was traded by the Brewers to the Cleveland Indians for Ben McDonald.

Regular season

Season standings

Record vs. opponents

Notable transactions
 June 2, 1998: J. J. Putz was drafted by the Brewers in the 17th round of the 1998 Major League Baseball draft, but did not sign.
 June 24, 1998: Dave Weathers was selected off waivers by the Milwaukee Brewers from the Cincinnati Reds.
 July 23, 1998: Doug Jones was traded by the Brewers to the Cleveland Indians for Eric Plunk.
 July 31, 1998: Mike Kinkade was traded by the Brewers to the New York Mets for Bill Pulsipher.
 August 7, 1998: Jeff Juden was selected off waivers from the Brewers by the Anaheim Angels.

Roster

Player stats

Batting

Starters by position
Note: Pos = Position; G = Games played; AB = At bats; R = Runs; H = Hits; Avg. = Batting average; HR = Home runs; RBI = Runs batted in; SB = Stolen bases

Other batters
Note: G = Games played; AB = At bats; R = Runs; H = Hits; HR = Home runs; RBI = Runs batted in; Avg. = Batting average; SB = Stolen bases

Pitching

Starting pitchers 
Note: G = Games pitched; IP = Innings pitched; W = Wins; L = Losses; ERA = Earned run average; SO = Strikeouts

Other pitchers 
Note: G = Games pitched; IP = Innings pitched; W = Wins; L = Losses; ERA = Earned run average; SO = Strikeouts

Relief pitchers 
Note: G = Games pitched; IP = Innings pitched; W = Wins; L = Losses; SV = Saves;  ERA = Earned run average; SO = Strikeouts

Farm system

The Brewers' farm system consisted of eight minor league affiliates in 1998. The Brewers operated a Venezuelan Summer League team as a co-op with the Florida Marlins and San Francisco Giants. VSL Guacara 1 won the Venezuelan Summer League championship.

References

1998 Milwaukee Brewers team at Baseball-Reference
1998 Milwaukee Brewers team page at www.baseball-almanac.com

Milwaukee Brewers seasons
Milwaukee Brewers season
Milwaukee Brew